Ri (hiragana: り, katakana: リ) is one of the Japanese kana, each of which represent one mora. Both are written with two strokes and both represent the sound . Both originate from the character 利. The Ainu language uses a small katakana ㇼ to represent a final r sound after an i sound (イㇼ ir). The combination of an R-column kana letter with handakuten ゜- り゚ in hiragana, and リ゚ in katakana was introduced to represent [li] in the early 20th century.

The hiragana character may also be written as a single stroke.

Stroke order

Other communicative representations

 Full Braille representation

 Computer encodings

See also

 Japanese phonology
 Yori (kana)
 IJ (digraph), a Dutch digraph that is sometimes written in a manner resembling the katakana リ

References

Specific kana